Ayntap is a village in the Masis Municipality of the Ararat Province of Armenia.

References 

World Gazeteer: Armenia – World-Gazetteer.com
Report of the results of the 2001 Armenian Census

Populated places in Ararat Province